Gustavus Walter Roach (20 December 1885 – 6 May 1971) was an Australian rules footballer who played with South Melbourne, Essendon and St Kilda in the Victorian Football League (VFL).

Family
He married Violet Emily Parkes in 1912.

Football
Roach, who played mostly on the wing or across half forward, made his league and South Melbourne debut in the opening round of the 1907 VFL season but did not feature again for the rest of the year.

He spent the 1908 season playing for St Kilda Wednesday.

In 1909 he returned to the VFL and had one season stints at both Essendon, and St Kilda.

He later played for Victorian Football Association (VFA) clubs North Melbourne, Brighton and Hawthorn.

Death
He died on 6 May 1971.

Footnotes

References
 Maplestone, M., Flying Higher: History of the Essendon Football Club 1872–1996, Essendon Football Club, (Melbourne), 1996.

External links
 Wally Roach: The VFA Project.
 

1885 births
Australian rules footballers from Victoria (Australia)
Sydney Swans players
Essendon Football Club players
St Kilda Football Club players
Prahran Football Club players
Brighton Football Club players
North Melbourne Football Club (VFA) players
Hawthorn Football Club (VFA) players
1971 deaths